Damane Zakaria was a Central African warlord, leader of Patriotic Rally for the Renewal of the Central African Republic armed group.

Biography 
He was born as Moustapha Maloum in Boromata in Vakaga prefecture. He belonged to Goula ethnic group. In 2006 he created Union of Democratic Forces for Unity armed group. In 2012 he joined Séléka coalition. Later he became general in Popular Front for the Rebirth of Central African Republic which formed from ex-Séléka. In 2014 he created Patriotic Rally for the Renewal of the Central African Republic as a splinter group from FPRC.

He was killed on 12 February 2022 by Russian mercenaries from Wagner Group in Ouadda together with 20 of his men.

References

20th-century births
2022 deaths
African warlords
People from Vakaga
Central African Republic military personnel
People killed in the Central African Republic Civil War
People of the Central African Republic Civil War
Assassinated Central African Republic people
Year of birth missing